The 1928 Florida gubernatorial election was held on November 6, 1928 to elect the Governor of Florida. Democratic nominee Doyle E. Carlton defeated Republican nominee William J. Howey with 60.97% of the vote.

After the 1928 election, no Republican candidate would carry even a single county in a Florida gubernatorial race again until 1960.

Primary elections
Primary elections were held on June 5, 1928.

Democratic primary

Candidates
Doyle E. Carlton, former State Senator
Sidney Johnston Catts, former Governor
Fons A. Hathaway, chairman of the Florida State Road Department.
John Stansel Taylor
J. M. Carson

Results

General election

Candidates
Doyle E. Carlton, Democratic
William J. Howey, Republican, businessman, real estate developer and mayor of Howey-in-the-Hills.

Results

References

1928
Florida
Gubernatorial